Järlåsa is a locality situated in Uppsala Municipality, Uppsala County, Sweden with 577 inhabitants in 2020.

References 

Populated places in Uppsala County
Populated places in Uppsala Municipality